Junkyard Nostalgias is the fourth album by Norwegian pop/experimental singer-songwriter Kaada. It was the second album by Kaada not to be released by Ipecac Recordings (the first being MECD) — instead, it was released by his own label, Kaada Recordings.

The album comes with eleven postcards depicting Polish landscapes.

Track listing

External links
 Official website
 Buy the album

Kaada albums
2009 albums